James Oddie Welsh (February 10, 1910 – October 24, 1988) was a Canadian curler. He was the skip of the 1947 Brier Champion team, representing Manitoba. A member of the Deer Lodge Curling Club in Winnipeg, he was also a three-time provincial champion. He died in 1988 and was buried at Chapel Lawn Memorial Gardens in Winnipeg.

References

Brier champions
1910 births
1988 deaths
Curlers from Manitoba
People from Leith
Scottish emigrants to Canada
Canadian male curlers
Curlers from Edinburgh